Annihilation of the Wicked is the fourth studio album by American technical death metal band Nile. The album was released on May 23, 2005, by Relapse Records. This is the first Nile album to feature George Kollias on drums, replacing Tony Laureano. This album marks Nile's last record released by Relapse. The liner notes detail the theme and writing/recording process of each song. A music video for "Sacrifice Unto Sebek" was produced. It is also the first Nile album produced by Neil Kernon.

Songs
"Von Unaussprechlichen Kulten" is German for "Of Unspeakable Cults", which is also the title of a fictional book from H.P. Lovecraft's universe.

Release
A limited edition box set comes in a tin box with a custom Serpent Ankh necklace, full color album poster, vinyl sticker and an embroidered patch, limited to 5,000 copies.

Track listing
All lyrics written by Karl Sanders. All music written by Karl Sanders except where noted.

Personnel
 Karl Sanders − guitars, vocals, bağlama, keyboards, bouzouki
 Dallas Toler-Wade − guitars, vocals
 George Kollias − drums
 Jon Vesano − bass, vocals
Additional musicians
 Mike Brezeale − exorcism chants and Pazuzu bowl on "Chapter of Obeisance Before Giving Breath to the Inert One in the Presence of the Crescent Shaped Horns"
Production
 Bob Moore − engineering
 Orion Landau − artwork, layout
 Neil Kernon − recording, mixing, producer

References

2005 albums
Albums produced by Neil Kernon
Nile (band) albums
Relapse Records albums